Carlos Eduardo Santos Motta (February 25, 1955 – October 30, 2018) was a competitive judoka from Brazil, who represented his native country at the 1976 Summer Olympics in Montréal, Quebec, Canada. Nicknamed "Tico" he won the silver medal at the 1975 Pan American Games in the men's middleweight division (– 80 kg), after a loss in the final against Canada's Rainer Fischer.

References
 
 judobrasil

Judoka at the 1976 Summer Olympics
Olympic judoka of Brazil
1955 births
Living people
Place of birth missing (living people)
Brazilian male judoka
Pan American Games silver medalists for Brazil
Pan American Games medalists in judo
Judoka at the 1975 Pan American Games
Medalists at the 1975 Pan American Games
21st-century Brazilian people
20th-century Brazilian people